Identity Digital Inc. is a company with affiliated entities that operate in the domain name industry, including a domain name registrar and registry services provider. The company acquired the registry operator and back-end registry services divisions of Afilias, Inc. in 2020. Both Donuts Inc. (the parent company) and Afilias Inc. were rebranded and brought under the single company brand name Identity Digital in 2022.

Donuts Inc 

Donuts Inc. was a parent company with affiliated entities that operated in the domain name industry, including a domain name registrar and registries that provided paid domain names via its subsidiaries’ registry operator status (for example, managing the .social gTLD) and contracts between its subsidiaries and other registries and registrars.

Afilias 
Afilias was founded in October 2000 by a group of 19 major domain name registrars. In November 2020, Afilias was acquired by the domain name registry operator Donuts.

References

External links

Domain name registrars
American companies established in 2022